Stiltskin are a Scottish rock band, who first achieved widespread popularity in the mid-1990s. Stiltskin are led by frontman Ray Wilson, the only constant member throughout the band's history. They are best known for their 1994 UK chart-topper, "Inside".

Career
The band was put together in 1994 by multi-instrumentalist/songwriter Peter Lawlor to front the record he had made of the music he had written for the British Levi's television advertisement, "Creek". The resulting single, "Inside" topped the UK Singles Chart in 1994, but the band failed to produce further matching chart success with the follow-up single "Footsteps" reaching No. 34. The Ambrosian Singers performed Lawlor's choir-like intro vocals to "Inside". All instruments on the band's hit "Inside" were played by Peter Lawlor; this was also the case on the album track "An Illusion". The original line-up released only one album, The Mind's Eye, which achieved a silver record in the UK, and sold in decent quantities throughout Europe. The band made significant critical inroads in the US music scene, but little was to follow in the way of sales, though "Inside" reached No. 37 on the Billboard Mainstream Rock chart.

The original Stiltskin disbanded in 1996, during the recording of their uncompleted second album, for which James Finnigan had been replaced on bass by Aubrey Nunn, who later worked with Faithless.

Lawlor continued to run Water Music, writing and producing many high-profile themes: he wrote all of the music for the BBC One 'Rhythm & Movement' idents and also the theme for the 2000 Olympic Games coverage, and the theme for Premier League and FA Cup football matches shown on TV. Simultaneously, he worked as a city economist and academic economics lecturer, becoming Principal Economic Advisor at the German Stock Exchange "Deutsche Boerse'.

McFarlane went on to work with The Proclaimers and achieved another number one in the UK Singles Chart. He went on to join the band Texas in 2009, leaving in early 2019.

Wilson joined Genesis and recorded Calling All Stations with the band (released in 1997) and toured Europe the following year. In 1999 he formed Cut_. In 2002 he launched a solo career.

In 2005, Wilson put a new band together under the name Stiltskin. Wilson himself and touring keyboardist Irvin Duguid (who later left the line-up) were the only members from the original line-up.

The new incarnation of Stiltskin released the album She in 2006. They toured Europe during 2006 and 2007, and a live album entitled Stiltskin Live, recorded on 25 October 2006, with material from this tour, was released in April 2007. In 2008, Stiltskin toured across Europe. A new Stiltskin album called Unfulfillment  was released in 2011. In 2015 it was reported in the Edinburgh Evening News that drummer Ashley Macmillan had left Stiltskin to become a Chef, citing the rigours of touring as a reason for the change.

Personnel

Members

Current members
 Ray Wilson  - lead vocals (1994–1996, 2005–present), guitars (2005–present)
 Ali Ferguson - guitars, backing vocals (2006–present)
 
 Lawrie MacMillan - bass guitars, backing vocals (2006–present)
 Filip Walcerz - keyboards (2010–present)
 Steve Wilson - guitars, backing vocals (2010–present)

Former members
 James Finnigan - bass guitars, keyboards (1994–1995)
 Peter Lawlor - guitars, bass guitars, keyboards, drums, backing vocals (1994–1996)
 Ross McFarlane - drums, percussion (1994–1996)
 Aubrey Nunn - bass guitars (1995–1996)
 Irvin Duguid - keyboards (2005–2006; touring musician - 1994-1995)
 Uwe Metzler - guitars (2005–2011)
 Alvin Mills - bass guitars (2005–2006)
 Henrik Muller - drums, percussion (2005–2006)
 Scott Spence - guitars (2005–2006)
 Nir Zidkyahu - drums, percussion (2005–2006)
 Ashley MacMillan - drums, percussion (2006–2015)

Lineups

Timeline

Discography

Studio albums

Live albums

Singles

References

External links
 Uwe Metzler Myspace
Ali Ferguson Myspace
Ashley Macmillan Myspace

British post-grunge groups
Scottish rock music groups
Inside Out Music artists
East West Records artists